Andrea King (born Georgette André Barry; February 1, 1919 – April 22, 2003) was an American stage, film, and television actress, sometimes billed as Georgette McKee.

Early life
Andrea King was born Georgette André Barry on February 1, 1919, in Paris, France. At the age of two months, she and her American mother, Lovinia Belle Hart, moved to the United States. She lived with her grandmother in Cleveland, Ohio, and Palm Beach, Florida, for the first four years of her life while her mother attended Columbia University in New York City. When her mother married Douglas McKee, King went to live with them in Forest Hills, Queens. As a teenager, King attended the progressive Edgewood School in Greenwich, Connecticut, a northern campus of Marietta Johnson's Organic School of Education. Playing Juliet in a school production when she was 14, she was asked to audition for a role in a Lee Shubert play, which led to other stage work.

Career
Andrea King appeared in Broadway plays and other theater work. Her Broadway credits included Fly Away Home (1935) and Growing Pains (1933). She also appeared as Mary Skinner in Life with Father. Her film debut was in a docudrama, The March of Time's first feature-length film titled The Ramparts We Watch (1940). In 1944, she signed with Warner Bros. and changed her stage name to King (some of her early movies have her credited as "Georgette McKee", her stepfather's name). King appeared uncredited in the Bette Davis film Mr. Skeffington (1944), followed by another ten movies in the next three years. The Warner Bros. studio photographers voted King the most photogenic actress for the year 1945.

She co-starred in the mystery-horror film, The Beast with Five Fingers (1946), and a drama, The Man I Love (1947), both opposite Robert Alda. King was originally cast to play Dr. Lilith Ritter in Nightmare Alley, a film noir directed by Edmund Goulding, but she chose instead the role of the sophisticated Marjorie Lundeen in Ride the Pink Horse (1947).

In the 1950s, King had leading roles in the film noirs Dial 1119 and Southside 1-1000 (both 1950) and a science-fiction story, Red Planet Mars (1952). She later played supporting roles in Hollywood feature films such as The World in His Arms (1952) with Gregory Peck and Band of Angels (1957) with Clark Gable.

Television
In the 1960s and 1970s, most of her acting work was on television, including the ABC/Warner Bros. Television Western series Maverick episode "Two Tickets to Ten Strike" opposite James Garner. In 1959–1960, King appeared twice as Duchess in the episodes "The Blizzard" and "The Devil Made Fire" of another ABC/WB Western series, The Alaskans, starring Roger Moore, Jeff York, Ray Danton, and Dorothy Provine, as well as in multiple episodes of the ABC/WB private-eye series 77 Sunset Strip and Hawaiian Eye. She also guest-starred in a 1960 episode of The Tom Ewell Show.

She made four guest appearances on Perry Mason between 1959 and 1963, including the role of murderer Barbara Heywood in the 1959 episode, "The Case of the Bedeviled Doctor". King continued to act on television until 1990, when she played her final role on the Murder, She Wrote episode, "The Fixer-Upper". She appeared twice more as herself on the A&E series, Biography, recalling her work with Peter Lorre and Montgomery Clift.

For her contribution to television, she received a star on the Hollywood Walk of Fame in February 1960.

Personal life

According to her Los Angeles Times obituary, King was married to lawyer Nat Willis from 1940 until his death in 1970. In her later life, she authored children's books and was active in Democratic politics. During the 1952 presidential election, she supported the campaign of Adlai Stevenson. She was an Episcopalian.

Death
On April 22, 2003, King died in hospice care while in residence at the Motion Picture and Television Country House and Hospital, in Woodland Hills, California.

Filmography

References

External links

 Official web site
 
  (as Georgette McKee)
 
 

1919 births
2003 deaths
20th-century American actresses
20th-century American memoirists
20th-century American women writers
American Episcopalians
American Shakespearean actresses
American film actresses
American stage actresses
American television actresses
American women memoirists
Burials at Zion Episcopal Churchyard (Charles Town, West Virginia)
California Democrats
People from Forest Hills, Queens
People from Palm Beach, Florida
Warner Bros. contract players
Western (genre) film actresses
Western (genre) television actors
French Anglicans
French emigrants to the United States
French people of American descent